Lynn G. Clark is an American professor of botany at Iowa State University who is an expert in tropical woody bamboos. As a high school student, Clark worked summers with grass expert Thomas Soderstrom at the National Museum of Natural History.  She obtained her Ph.D. in botany working with Richard Pohl at Iowa State.

References

Faculty page at Iowa State University

21st-century American botanists
1956 births
Living people